Grovana is a Swiss watch manufacturer, originally established in 1924 in Tenniken, Switzerland, about  south of Basel. In 2001, it received a licence to produce Revue Thommen watches, which ended in 2014. The company employs 35 people in its headquarters.

Grovana is a private and family-owned company. Christopher Bitterli, the son of the company founder, became vice president in 1998 and has been president and CEO since 2009. Its corporate slogan is "Your Time is Our Tradition"

Grovana distributes its watches worldwide through retail and online distributors.

References

External links
Revue Thommen watches website
Grovana Watch Company website

Watch manufacturing companies of Switzerland